Nomreh-ye Noh is a village in Howmeh-ye Sharqi Rural District, in the Central District of Ramhormoz County, Khuzestan Province, Iran. At the 2006 census, its population was 136, in 30 families.

References 

Populated places in Ramhormoz County